Yiewsley and West Drayton was a local government district in Middlesex, England from 1929 to 1965. Its area became the south-west of the London Borough of Hillingdon.

Establishment and expansion
The Yiewsley and West Drayton Urban District evolved from the Yiewsley Urban District which had been established on 14 April 1911 by an Order of the Middlesex County Council  granting the Civil Parish of Yiewsley urban powers.  

Historically Yiewsley had been a district in the Parish of Hillingdon and became part of the Parish of Hillingdon East when the Hillingdon Parish was divided under the Local Government Act of 1894,  
also becoming part of the new Uxbridge Rural District. Yiewsley became a Civil Parish in 1896, remaining in the Uxbridge Rural District until becoming an Urban District in 1911.

On 7 December 1928 Middlesex County Council issued an Order for the Uxbridge Rural District to be amalgamated into the Uxbridge Urban District, with the exception of the Parish of Northolt and the Parish of West Drayton. The Parish of West Drayton was to be transferred to the Urban District of Yiewsley with the Urban District being renamed Yiewsley and West Drayton. The Urban District Council was to increase in size to have 15 members, 9 representing the Yiewsley Ward and 6 representing the West Drayton Ward. The Order was to come into force on 31 March 1929.

Elections for the Council took place on Saturday 23 March 1929  and the first meeting of the new Council members was held on Wednesday 3 April 1929.      

On 31 March 1930 an Order of the Middlesex County Council dissolved the Staines Rural District with the Yiewsley and West Drayton Urban District amalgamating the Parish of Harmondsworth which included the villages of Longford, Sipson and Heathrow. The composition of the Urban Council was changed with the number of Ward members increased to 22. Yiewsley Ward members were increased to 12, West Drayton Ward members reduced to 5 and Harmondsworth Ward members having also 5 (In line with the estimated population of each Ward: Yiewsley 6,134 - West Drayton 2,499 - Harmondsworth 2,600). Urban District elections took place on Saturday 22 March 1930 with the new Ward members attending their first meeting of the Urban District Council on Tuesday 1 April 1930.  On Friday 23 May 1930 the Urban District's new Town Hall in Yiewsley was officially opened by Mr. F. E. Dominey, J.P., the Chairman of the Council. 

After the Second World War the Town Hall became too small to meet the needs of the Urban District. Drayton Hall in West Drayton was purchased with the official opening taking place on 5 April 1952. The building was extended in 1955.

Abolition
The Yiewsley and West Drayton Urban District, with the whole County of Middlesex, formed part of the review area of the Royal Commission on Local Government in Greater London. Its report published in 1960, proposed 52 Greater London Boroughs with one being formed from the Municipal Borough of Uxbridge, the Ruislip-Northwood Urban District and the Yiewsley and West Drayton Urban District. The UK Government produced a White paper on 29 November 1961 which proposed fewer, larger boroughs. With the introduction of legislation in 1962 the number of boroughs had been reduced to 32 with the Hayes and Harlington Urban District joining the three other administrative areas in forming a new borough. The London Government Act 1963 created the London Borough of Hillingdon in the new county of Greater London on 1 April 1965.

Civic history

Coat of arms

The coat of arms of Yiewsley and West Drayton, which included Heathrow Airport, was granted in 1953 shortly before the coronation of Queen Elizabeth II. It was: 

The coat of arms of the London Borough of Hillingdon replicated in its logo re-uses splayed eagle wings, the Tudor rose and the main feature of its crest above is a red demi-lion with silver/white wings whose undersides (one visible as the lion is side-on) have the red cross of St George.

References

External links

Districts abolished by the London Government Act 1963
History of the London Borough of Hillingdon
History of local government in Middlesex
Urban districts of England